Kuni is a Malayo-Polynesian languages of the central southern coast of the Papuan Peninsula in Papua New Guinea.

External links 
 A number of collections in Paradisec include Kuni materials

References

Central Papuan Tip languages
Languages of Central Province (Papua New Guinea)